The Olympus Zuiko Digital ED 90-250mm 1:2.8 is an interchangeable telezoom lens announced by Olympus Corporation on February 17, 2005.

References
http://www.dpreview.com/products/olympus/lenses/oly_90-250_2p8/specifications

External links
 

090-250mm f 2.8 ED
Camera lenses introduced in 2005